The Czech Republic, presented as Czechia from 2023, has participated in the Eurovision Song Contest 10 times since making its debut in .

In , Gabriela Gunčíková became the first Czech entrant to reach the final, finishing 25th with the song "I Stand". In 2019, Czech band Lake Malawi finished eleventh, achieving the country's second best result in the contest. The third best result was achieved in 2022 by the band We Are Domi, finishing 22nd.

History

Before participation
During the time of Czechoslovakia,  (ČST) is known to have broadcast a number of editions of the Contest in Czechoslovakia during the 1960s, 1970s, 1980s and early 1990s. Karel Gott, one of the most popular Czechoslovakian artist, represented Austria in the 1968 contest, held in London, United Kingdom. Furthermore, the Prague Theatre of Illuminated Drawings from the Czech capital performed as interval act in the 1984 contest, held in Luxembourg City, Luxembourg. Czechoslovakia was even a member of EBU for a short time before its dissolution in 1993.

After the dissolution of Czechoslovakia, the Czech Republic's partner Slovakia immediately attempted to enter the contest in 1993, entering the contest three times between 1994 and 1998, before withdrawing.

Czech broadcaster  had originally planned to send an entry to the 2005 contest, held in Kyiv, Ukraine. However, this did not materialise for various reasons. ČT again looked at sending an entry to the 2006 contest in Athens, Greece, but failed to do so after having doubts that the country would qualify for the final.

2007–2009: First years of participation 
Eurosong 2007 featured 10 songs, with the public voting for the winner through SMS voting. However one song was withdrawn before the show began, leaving only 9 songs to compete. The winner was rock band Kabát with the song "". At the contest's semi-final on 10 May 2007 the Czech Republic performed 16th in the semi-final, however only received one point (which came from Estonia) from the televoters around Europe.

At the second semi-final of the contest, Kerndlová performed 8th in the running order, receiving 9 points for her performance (1 point from Turkey and Malta, 2 points from Croatia and 5 points from Macedonia), placing 18th of 19 entries, and failing once again to qualify the Czech Republic to the final.

The broadcaster chose Romani band Gipsy.cz in January 2009 to compete in Moscow – the band had previously competed in the two previous national finals, coming both times in the top three. Two songs were presented to the Czech public to vote on: "" and "Do You Wanna". After 14 days of voting, "Aven Romale" emerged as the winner, which featured lead singer Radoslav Banga dressing-up as the superhero character Super Gypsy. The group performed 2nd on the night of the first semi-final of the contest, held on 12 May 2009. However, the group managed to receive no points from the 20 countries voting in the semi-final, becoming the 16th entry to achieve this result since the current voting method was introduced in 1975.

The absence would last for another four years.

2015–present: Return 
"Hope Never Dies" by Marta Jandová and Václav Noid Bárta failed to qualify from the semi-final; it did, however, give the Czech Republic their best result up to that point, placing 13th in the semi-final with 33 points. In , the Czech Republic qualified to the final for the first time in the contest's history with "I Stand" by Gabriela Gunčíková, which went on to place 25th with 41 points, all from the juries. In , Martina Bárta was internally selected to perform "My Turn", and finished 13th in her semi-final.

The winner was "Lie to Me" by Mikolas Josef. During the first dress rehearsal for the first semi-final, Josef suffered a back injury, and was transferred to several hospitals and was temporarily unable to walk, but still promised to perform by the time of the semi-final. The choreography was adjusted to accommodate his injury, and his performance earned the Czech Republic their second appearance in the final. "Lie to Me" wound up placing fifteenth in the jury vote and fourth in the televote, resulting in an overall sixth place. This marked the Czech Republic's first ever top ten placement, and first time receiving televote points in the final. Following this, the Czech Head of Delegation Jan Bors confirmed that the national selection model would be used for future contests as a result of Josef's success.

Unlike the national selection for the 2018 contest, the results of the international voting public were added as one individual jury member. Placing second in the Czech public vote and joint first in the jury vote, "Friend of a Friend" by Lake Malawi emerged as the winner, thus earning the right to represent the Czech Republic in Tel Aviv. Lake Malawi managed to qualify, making it the third time the Czech Republic participated in a Eurovision final. They ended on eleventh place, the country's second best result in the contest.

However, in November 2019, ČT announced that the televised national final had been cancelled, and that an online selection would again be used. The chosen entrant was Benny Cristo with "Kemama", and was supposed to perform in the second semi-final, but the 2020 contest was ultimately cancelled due to the COVID-19 pandemic. Cristo participated in the second semi-final on 20 May 2021, performing 3rd, however, he failed to qualify for the final. It was later revealed that he had finished in 15th place with 23 points, all from the juries.

Seven entries competed and the winning entry, "Lights Off" by We Are Domi, was determined by the combination of votes from a twelve-member international jury panel (50%), an international public vote (25%) and a Czech public vote (25%). Both international and Czech users were able to vote via the official Eurovision Song Contest app between 7 and 15 December 2021, and the winner was announced on 16 December 2021. We Are Domi performed in the second semi-final on 12 May 2022, and placed fourth with 227 points, thereby achieving the Czech Republic's fourth final appearance. They went on to finish in 22nd place with 38 points.

Participation overview

Related involvement

Heads of delegation
The public broadcaster of each participating country in the Eurovision Song Contest assigns a head of delegation as the EBU's contact person and the leader of their delegation at the event. The delegation, whose size can greatly vary, includes a head of press, the contestants, songwriters, composers and backing vocalists, among others.

Commentators and spokespersons
For the show's broadcast on Česká televize, various commentators have provided commentary on the contest in the Czech language. At the Eurovision Song Contest after all points are calculated, the presenters of the show call upon each voting country to invite each respective spokesperson to announce the results of their vote on-screen.

Gallery

See also 
 Czech Republic in the Eurovision Young Musicians
 Czech Republic in the Eurovision Young Dancers

Notes

References

External links 
 Points to and from Czech Republic eurovisioncovers.co.uk

 
Countries in the Eurovision Song Contest